Grand Tarakan Mall is a mall in the Tarakan, North Kalimantan, one of the major cities in Borneo. The Jakarta Post calls it "one of the biggest shopping centers in the city—and it is also the biggest in the entire region of Kalimantan.

The Mall is a central location where student congregate, and demonstrations sometimes take place

References

Shopping malls in Indonesia
Buildings and structures in North Kalimantan
Tourist attractions in North Kalimantan
Tarakan